Radha Comics was an Indian comics publication in the late 80s and early 90s. It was published by Radha Pocket Books, Meerut, India.  It was published on a monthly schedule with usually four to six comics in each monthly comic-set. The comics were published in Hindi only.

The most successful series published was Shaktiputra.  Shaktiputra is a character similar to RoboCop in appearance and abilities.  He is a crime fighter cyborg fitted with the brain of inspector Vikram, who devoted his life to become a Half Robot. His inventor was Prof. Padhmanabhan, an eminent scientist of India.  His body is made of metal except his face, which too is covered with a helmet.  He uses weapons such as a sword, shield, laser revolver and also have a special power in his helmet. 

The following are other Radha Comics characters: 

 Bauna Jasoos
 Judo Queen Radha 
 Mahakaal 
 Rudraal 
 Janbaaz Jwala 
 Chacha Chaubey 
 Naagesh 
 Iron Man 
 Raja Jaani 
 Fantoosh

References

Indian comics
Comic book publishing companies of India
Meerut